is a mountain of the Tokachi Volcanic Group.

Geology
Mount Oputateshike is made from non-alkaline mafic volcanic rock.

References

See also
 Tokachi Volcanic Group
 Central Ishikari Mountains
 Daisetsuzan National Park

Oputateshike
Biei, Hokkaido